Harpalus dudkoi is a species of ground beetle in the subfamily Harpalinae. It was described by Kataev in 2011.

References

dudkoi
Beetles described in 2011